Dachanghe, possibly Da Changhe or Changhe, was a monarchy from 902 to 928 in modern Yunnan, China. Founded by Zheng Maisi (鄭買嗣), it was the successor state of Nanzhao (738–902), whose ruling Meng (蒙) family was mass-murdered in a bloody coup by Zheng. The Zheng family suffered a similar fate 26 years later at the hands of Yang Ganzhen (楊干貞), who helped found a state named Datianxing (大天興) (928–929).

Dachanghe bordered Former Shu to its north.

Rulers
 Zheng Maisi (鄭買嗣) 903-909
 Zheng Renmin (鄭仁旻) 910-926
 Zheng Longdan (鄭隆亶) 926-927

References

History of Yunnan
Former countries in Chinese history
902 establishments
10th-century establishments in China
928 disestablishments
10th-century disestablishments in China
Former monarchies of East Asia
States and territories established in the 900s
States and territories disestablished in the 10th century